"Never Really Over" is a song by American singer Katy Perry, released on May 31, 2019 by Capitol Records. The song was later included on the track list of her sixth studio album, Smile (2020), as the first song on the album. It is an electropop track inspired by Norwegian singer Dagny's "Love You Like That" (2017). The song received critical acclaim with praise towards the production and hook. 

"Never Really Over" peaked within the top 10 in as Australia, Canada, Croatia, Greece, Hungary, Lebanon, Malaysia, Mexico, the Philippines and Scotland as well as the top 20 in Belgium, the Czech Republic, Estonia, Ireland, Latvia, Lithuania, the Netherlands, New Zealand, Panama, Poland, Singapore, Slovakia, the United Kingdom and the United States. At the APRA Music Awards of 2020, "Never Really Over" was nominated for Most Performed Pop Work of the Year.

Promotion and release
On May 27, Universal Music Group first hinted towards a new project when a few selected fans were invited to a "Katy Perry Fan Event" that took place two days later. Perry announced the song and revealed the official artwork on her Instagram on May 28. Its cover shows her with blonde hair and wearing an orange dress. The song was made available for pre-save on Spotify upon announcement. Good Morning America teased the song and the music video on May 30, 2019, before its release the following day.

On November 29, 2019, a Black Friday Record Store Day limited edition 12" orange vinyl was released, pairing the song with Perry's next single "Small Talk".

Composition

"Never Really Over" is an electropop and dance-pop song that contains a steady bubblegum and house beat, as well as propulsive synth chords. Perry co-wrote the song with Gino Barletta, Hayley Warner and its producers Leah Haywood and Daniel James of Dreamlab, as well as Zedd, with whom Perry previously collaborated on "365". The track is inspired by the 2017 song "Love You Like That", performed by Dagny and written by Dagny, Michelle Buzz and Jason Gill, who all received writing credits for "Never Really Over". Despite their credits, Dagny "never sat down in a room with Katy, or wrote the song for her", but had been contacted by Perry's team in early 2019 and told that "they had been really inspired, and had a song that was like their version of ["Love You Like That"]". It runs for three minutes and 44 seconds and is performed in the key of A major with a tempo of 100 beats per minute.

Critical reception
The song received critical acclaim, with Jillian Mapes of Pitchfork called the song "a promising way forward" for Perry and her best single since 2013's "Walking on Air", appreciating the lyrics for not being "horrendously cheesy (a noted weak spot for Perry and her co-writers)". She wrote that Perry made "bad decisions sound enticing" and hailed it as her "most impressively tongue-tied chorus to date". Chris Willman of Variety shared a similar view, saying the repetition in the chorus "somehow works to the song's tongue-twisting advantage". The A.V. Clubs Gwen Ihant wrote that the track "puts Perry right back in earworm territory" and called it an "impressive showcase" of her vocals with an "addictive hook songwriters dream of".  In The New York Times, Jon Caramanica described it as "Norwegianish Spotifycore" and a "bubble-pop" song.

The Independent's Roisin O'Connor regarded "Never Really Over" as a "truly gratifying return" for Perry after "a period of misfires", noting that it has "hooks galore and harks back her Teenage Dream days of uplifting, bright pop music." Ilana Kaplan of Rolling Stone favored "the return of her hypnotic vocals" and felt the song "puts Perry back where she belongs: on Sugar Mountain." In his review for Clash, Robin Murray deemed it a "pop jewel". Mikael Wood of the Los Angeles Times compared the song's "willfully imprecise" lyrics and "carefully reverbed" vocals to "Me!" by Taylor Swift, concluding that despite its charms, "Perry is probably no better protected."

Commercial performance

"Never Really Over" debuted at number 15 on the US Billboard Hot 100 with 31,000 downloads and 15.8 million streams, giving Perry her 19th top 20 song in the country. "Never Really Over" also became her highest debut on the chart since "Chained to the Rhythm" in 2017 as well as her fifth highest entrance there overall. On April 26, 2021, the song was certified platinum  by the Recording Industry Association of America for equivalent sales of 1,000,000 units in the United States.

In the United Kingdom, the song opened at number 13 on the UK Singles Chart, becoming Perry's 19th top 20 entry in the nation and has since reached number 12. Elsewhere, "Never Really Over" debuted at number 47 in Germany, number seven on Australia's ARIA Singles Chart and at number 19 in New Zealand.

Music videos
A music video, directed by Philippa Price, was released along with the single on May 31, 2019. On May 29, 2019, Perry shared a teaser for the music video with the caption "Let it go..." It amassed more than 17.7 million views within its first day of release. It currently has more than 100 million views. The music video was shot at King Gillette Ranch in Malibu, California.

Reception
Sal Cinquemani of Slant Magazine praised the style and cinematography of the music video. He called it "a playful and imaginative portrayal of love's intoxicating spell and the lengths some of us will go to exorcise ourselves of it."

The video has been noted for its cultural references to hippie era and artistic similarities to New Age symbolism. Suzy Byrne of Yahoo! noted the video's spiritual themes and called Perry a "New Age goddess". She praised the concept and remarked that it was a "well-choreographed video".

Visual album video 
On August 26, 2020, Perry posted a visual album video of "Never Really Over" to her YouTube channel. It features a first-person view of an animated person living a day at home whilst in the COVID-19 pandemic. Perry has said that the video is based on her "experiences with dishes during quarantine".

Live performances

On July 15, 2019, Perry uploaded the first live performance of the song in a bathroom on her official Instagram account. On August 20, 2019, she also performed the song at Amazon's Post-Prime Day Concert in Seattle, Washington. Perry also performed the song in May 2020 on Good Morning America as part of their summer concert series.

The song is included on the setlist of Perrys concert residency Play.
In January 2022, Perry performed an acoustic version of the song on Saturday Night Live.

Track listing
 Digital download and streaming
 "Never Really Over" – 3:43

 Digital download and streaming (R3hab remix)
 "Never Really Over" (R3hab remix) – 3:07

 Digital download and streaming (Syn Cole remix)
 "Never Really Over" (Syn Cole remix) – 3:08

 Digital download and streaming (Wow & Flutter remix)
 "Never Really Over" (Wow & Flutter remix) – 6:11

 12-inch vinyl
 "Never Really Over" – 3:44
 "Small Talk" – 2:41

Credits and personnel
Credits adapted from Tidal.
 Katy Perry – vocals
 Zedd – producer, programming, mixer
 Gino Barletta – background vocals
 Hayley Warner – background vocals
 Leah Haywood – background vocals, producer, programming
 Dave Kutch – mastering engineer
 Daniel James – producer, programming
 Ryan Shanahan – engineer, additional mixer
 Brian Cruz – assistant recording engineer

Charts

Weekly charts

Year-end charts

Certifications

Release history

References

2019 singles
2019 songs
Katy Perry songs
New Age in popular culture
Songs written by Daniel James (record producer)
Songs written by Hayley Warner
Songs written by Jason Gill (musician)
Songs written by Katy Perry
Songs written by Leah Haywood
Songs written by Zedd
Capitol Records singles
Dance-pop songs
Electropop songs
Songs written by Gino Barletta